Gekko romblon, also known as the Philippine gecko or the Romblon narrow-disked gecko, is a species of gecko. It is found in the Philippines.

References

Gekko
Reptiles described in 1978
Reptiles of the Philippines
Endemic fauna of the Philippines